Benny de Weille (March 6, 1915, Lübeck - December 17, 1977, Westerland) was a German swing jazz clarinetist and bandleader.

De Weille studied clarinet under Hans Helmke and was heavily influenced by Benny Goodman, whom he often emulated in his own ensembles. He made recordings with Teddy Stauffer, Hans Rehmstedt, and Willy Berking in the 1930s and 1940s, and from 1940 led his own "Bar Trio". Following the war he worked at Radio Frankfurt and conducted the Nordwestdeutscher Rundfunk orchestra. His last recordings were in a Dixieland style in 1951.

References
"Benny de Weille". The New Grove Dictionary of Jazz, 1994, p. 286.

German jazz clarinetists
German male conductors (music)
Musicians from Lübeck
20th-century German conductors (music)
20th-century German male musicians
German male jazz musicians
1915 births
1977 deaths